Duke Ulrich of Pomerania (12 August 1589, in Barth – 31 October 1622, in Przybiernów), was a Lutheran administrator of the Prince-Bishopric of Cammin and non-reigning Duke of Pomerania.

Life 
Ulrich was the youngest son of Duke Bogislaw XIII of Pomerania (1544-1606) of the family of Griffins.  After their father's death, Ulrich and his brothers agreed on the division of their inheritance.  According to the agreement of 1 October 1606 the eldest brother, Philip II (1573-1618), became the reigning Duke of Pomerania-Stettin.  Francis (1577-1620) was a Protestant Bishop of Cammin. Bogislaw XIV (1580-1637) and George II (1582-1617) jointly received the district of  Rügenwalde.  Ulrich, the youngest received only an annual pension.

After Philip II died in 1618, he was succeeded by Francis as the ruler of Pomerania-Stettin, and Francis was succeeded by Ulrich as bishop of Cammin.  Like Francis before him, Ulrich resided in Koszalin.  Ulrich died on 31 October 1622.  He was buried in the castle church in Stettin.

The historian Martin Wehrmann (1861-1937) described Ulrich as a "fresh, young man, who had kept a benign happiness with his wife at his court in Koszalin".

Marriage 
Ulrich married in 1619 in Wolfenbüttel with Hedwig of Brunswick-Wolfenbüttel (1595-1650).  The marriage remained childless.  After Ulrich's death, Duchess Hedwig resided as a widow in Neustettin.  There, she founded a gymnasium in 1640, which was later named Hedwig's gymnasium, after her.

References 
 (additional entry)
 Martin Wehrmann: Geschichte von Pommern, vol. 2, Second Edition, Verlag Friedrich Andreas Perthes, Gotha, 1921, 
 Martin Wehrmann: Genealogie des pommerschen Herzogshauses, i the series Veröffentlichungen der landesgeschichtlichen Forschungsstelle für Pommern, series 1, vol. 5, Leon Saunier, Stettin 1937, p. 128–129

Footnotes 

House of Griffins
Dukes of Pomerania
Lutheran administrators of Cammin Prince-Bishopric
1589 births
1622 deaths
17th-century German people